The House at 131 West Davis Boulevard is a historic home in Tampa, Florida. It is located at 131 West Davis Boulevard. On January 8, 1990, it was added to the U.S. National Register of Historic Places.  Franklin O. Adams was the building's architect.

References

External links
 Hillsborough County listings at National Register of Historic Places

Houses in Tampa, Florida
History of Tampa, Florida
Houses on the National Register of Historic Places in Hillsborough County, Florida
Mediterranean Revival architecture of Davis Islands, Tampa, Florida